Noetia ponderosa, or the ponderous ark clam, is a marine clam in the family Noetiidae.

Description
The shape of the shell is rounded trigonal, almost as high as long, 
with 27-31 squared radial ribs divided by fine incised lines, 
and a distinctive brown or black periostracum. The exterior and interior of the shell is a white color. Size approximately 50-60 mm.

Distribution
Atlantic coast of North America, ranging from Virginia to Florida,
West Indies, Gulf of Mexico, and Caribbean Central America.

Habitat
Noetia ponderosa typically resides in shallow water on the ocean floor.

References

Noetiidae
Bivalves described in 1822